The 2020–21 Nebraska Cornhuskers women's basketball team represented the University of Nebraska during the 2020–21 NCAA Division I women's basketball season. The Cornhuskers, led by fifth year head coach Amy Williams, played their home games at Pinnacle Bank Arena and were members of the Big Ten Conference.

They finished the season 13–13, 9–10 in Big Ten play to finish in ninth place.  As the eight seed in the Big Ten women's tournament they defeated Minnesota in the Second Round before losing to eventual champions Maryland in the Quarterfinals.  They received an at-large bid to the WNIT.  They played in the Memphis regional and defeated  in the First Round before losing to Colorado in the Second Round to end their season.

Previous season
The Cornhuskers finished the season 17–13, 7–11 in Big Ten play to finish in tenth place. They lost in the second round of the Big Ten women's tournament to Michigan.  The NCAA tournament and WNIT were cancelled due to the COVID-19 outbreak.

Roster

Schedule

Source:

|-
!colspan=6 style=|Regular season

|-
!colspan=6 style=| Big Ten Women's Tournament

|-
!colspan=6 style=| WNIT

Rankings

The Coaches Poll did not release a Week 2 poll and the AP Poll did not release a poll after the NCAA Tournament.

See also
 2020–21 Nebraska Cornhuskers men's basketball team

References

Nebraska Cornhuskers women's basketball seasons
Nebraska
2021 in sports in Nebraska
2020 in sports in Nebraska
Nebraska